The 2017 FIA European Truck Racing Championship was a motor-racing championship using highly tuned tractor units. It was the 33rd year of the championship. Adam Lacko won the championship with Freightliner.

Teams and drivers

Calendar and winners

Championship standings

Drivers' Championship

Each round or racing event consisted of four races. At each race, points were awarded to the top ten classified finishers using the following structure:

† – Drivers did not finish the race, but were classified as they completed over 75% of the race distance.

Notes

References

External links

Race and championship results as table sheets

European Truck Racing Championship seasons
European Truck Racing Championship
Truck Racing Championship